Aframonius is a genus of adapiform primate that lived in Africa during the late Eocene or early Oligocene. Fossils of the genus were found in the Jebel Qatrani Formation of Egypt.

References

Bibliography 

 

Prehistoric strepsirrhines
Prehistoric primate genera
Monotypic prehistoric primate genera
Eocene primates
Eocene mammals of Africa
Fossils of Egypt
Fossil taxa described in 1995